Prekmurje Slovene, also known as the Prekmurje dialect, East Slovene, or Wendish (Prekmurje dialect: prekmürski jezik, prekmürščina, prekmörščina, prekmörski jezik, panonska slovenščina), is a Slovene dialect belonging to a Pannonian dialect group of Slovene. It is used in private communication, liturgy, and publications by authors from Prekmurje. It is spoken in the Prekmurje region of Slovenia and by the Hungarian Slovenes in Vas County in western Hungary. It is closely related to other Slovene dialects in neighboring Slovene Styria, as well as to Kajkavian with which it retains partial mutual intelligibility and forms a dialect continuum with other South Slavic languages.

Range 
The Prekmurje dialect is spoken by approximately 110,000 speakers worldwide. 80,000 in Prekmurje, 20,000 dispersed in Slovenia (especially Maribor and Ljubljana) and 10,000 in other countries. In Hungary it is used by the Slovene-speaking minority in Vas County in and around the town of Szentgotthárd. Other speakers of the dialect live in other Hungarian towns, particularly Budapest, Szombathely, Bakony, and Mosonmagyaróvár. The dialect was also spoken in Somogy (especially in the village of Tarany), but it has nearly disappeared in the last two centuries. There are some speakers in Austria, Germany, the United States, and Argentina.

Status 
Prekmurje Slovene has a defined territory and body of literature, and it is one of the few Slovene dialects in Slovenia that is still spoken by all strata of the local population. Some speakers have claimed that it is a separate language. Prominent writers in Prekmurje Slovene, such as Miklós Küzmics, István Küzmics, Ágoston Pável, József Klekl Senior, and József Szakovics, have claimed that it is a language, not simply a dialect. Evald Flisar, a writer, poet, and playwright from Prekmurje (Goričko), states that people from Prekmurje "talk in our own language." It also had a written standard and literary tradition, both of which were largely neglected after World War II. There were attempts to publish in it more widely in the 1990s, primarily in Hungary, and there has been a revival of literature in Prekmurje Slovene since the late 1990s.

Others consider Prekmurje Slovene a regional language, without denying that it is part of Slovene. The linguist Janko Dular has characterized Prekmurje Slovene as a "local standard language" for historical reasons, as has the Prekmurje writer Feri Lainšček. However, Prekmurje Slovene is not recognized as a language by Slovenia or Hungary, nor does it enjoy any legal protection under the European Charter for Regional or Minority Languages, although in 2016 the General Maister Society (Društvo General Maister) proposed that primary schools offer education in the dialect and some regional politicians and intellectuals advocate Prekmurje Slovene.

Together with Resian, Prekmurje Slovene is the only Slovene dialect with a literary standard that has had a different historical development from the rest of Slovene ethnic territory. For centuries, it was used as a language of religious education, as well as in the press and mass. The historical Hungarian name for the Slovenes living within the borders of the Kingdom of Hungary (as well as for the Slovenians in general) was Vendek, or the Wends. In the 18th and 19th centuries Prekmurje authors used to designate this dialect as sztári szlovenszki jezik 'old Slovene'. Both then and now, it is also referred to as the "Slovene language between the Mura and Raba" (Slovenščina med Muro in Rabo; Slovenski jezik med Mürov i Rábov).

Prekmurje Slovene is widely used in the regional media (Murski Val Radio, Porabje, Slovenski utrinki), films, literature. The younger generation also write SMS messages and web comments in their local tongue. In the Prekmurje and Hungary a few streets, shops, hotels, etc. have Prekmurje Slovene names. In the 2012 protests in Slovenia in Murska Sobota the protesters use Prekmurje Slovene banners. It is the liturgical language in the Lutheran and Pentecostal churches, and in the Catholic Church of Hungarian Slovenes. Marko Jesenšek, a professor at the University of Maribor, states that the functionality of Prekmurje Slovene is limited, but "it lives on in poetry and journalism."

Linguistic features 
Prekmurje Slovene is part of the Pannonian dialect group, also known as the eastern Slovene dialect group. Prekmurje Slovene shares many common features with the dialects of Haloze, Slovenske Gorice, and Prlekija, with which it is completely mutually intelligible. It is also closely related to the Kajkavian dialect of Croatian, although mutual comprehension is difficult. Prekmurje Slovene, especially its more traditional version spoken by the Hungarian Slovenes, is not readily understood by speakers from central and western Slovenia, whereas speakers from eastern Slovenia (Lower Styria) have much less difficulty understanding it. The early 20th-century philologist Ágoston Pável stated that Prekmurje Slovene "is in fact a large, autonomous dialect of Slovene, from which it differs mostly in stress, intonation, consonant softness and—due to the lack of a significant language reform—a scarceness of vocabulary of modern terms" and that it preserves "many ancient features."

Orthography 
Historically, Prekmurje Slovene was not written with the Bohorič alphabet used by Slovenes in Inner Austria, but with a Hungarian-based orthography. János Murkovics's textbook (1871) was the first book to use Gaj's Latin Alphabet.

Before 1914: Aa, Áá, Bb, Cc, Cscs, Dd, Ee, Éé, Êê, Ff, Gg, Gygy, Hh, Ii, Jj, Kk, Ll, Lyly, Mm, Nn, Nyny, Oo, Ôô, Öö, Őő, Pp, Rr, Szsz, Ss, Tt, Uu, Üü, Űű, Vv, Zz, Zszs.

After 1914: Aa, Áá, Bb, Cc, Čč, Dd, Ee, Éé, Êê, Ff, Gg, Gjgj, Hh, Ii, Jj, Kk, Ll, Ljlj, Mm, Nn, Njnj, Oo, Ôô, Öö, Pp, Rr, Ss, Šš, Tt, Uu, Üü, Vv, Zz, Žž.

Phonology 
The Prekmurje dialect has a phonology similar to the phonology of other eastern Slovene dialects. The vowels ü /y/ and ö [ø] (the latter is non-phonemic) are used, which do not appear in standard Slovene (e.g., günac 'ox', ülanca 'clay'). These vowels are particularly prominent in the northern dialects of Vendvidék and in Goričko. Older names of several settlements (e.g., Büdinci 'Budinci, Böltinci 'Beltinci', etc.), surnames (e.g., Küčan, Šömenek, etc.), and names of rivers and hills (e.g., Bükovnica, Törnjek, etc.) often had these sounds. Intonation, palatalization of consonants, and accentuation are also different. The diphthongs au or ou (unknown in standard Slovene but found in various dialects) are also widespread. Examples include Baug or Boug 'God' (standard Sln. Bog ), and kaus or kous 'piece' (standard Sln. kos ). In some dialects, the preposition and prefix v 'in' alternates with f, as in Kajkavian; for example, in Vendvidék fčará 'yesterday' (standard Sln. včeraj ).

Morphology 
Inflections are somewhat similar to Croatian. In Prekmurje Slovene, the expression "in Hungary" is v Vogrskoj (cf. Croatian u Ugarskoj, standard Slovenian na Ogrskem). One of the reasons for this closeness to standard Croatian is the long tradition of connections between the two peoples, because before the 18th century, most Prekmurje priests and teachers (both Catholic and Protestant) were educated in Croatia, particularly in Zagreb or Varaždin. In the old Martjanci Hymnal (Sztárá martyanszka peszmarica), the influences of Croatian are clear. The 18th-century Prekmurje writers that created Prekmurje Slovene applied many features of the Kajkavian dialect. In 1833, József Kossics, who was partially of Croatian descent, wrote a grammar emphasizing the Croatian features, with much of the terminology borrowed from Kajkavian, although elements from Styrian Slovene dialects were also included. Although the influence of Croatian liturgical Kajkavian is clear, both speeches ultimately descend from Pannonian or Carpathian Slavs who settled the area in which they are spoken in the first millennium and have enjoyed a parallel development. 

Prekmurje Slovene, like Standard Slovene, preserves a dual number along with the singular and plural; for example, müva sva 'the two of us are' (cf. Standard Slovene midva sva), vüva sta 'the two of you are' (cf. Standard Slovene vidva sta), njüva sta 'the two of them are' (cf. Standard Slovene onadva sta).

Lexicon 
The dialect includes many archaic words that have disappeared from modern Slovene. Some Prekmurje Slovene words can be found in the Freising manuscripts from the 9th century, the oldest written record in Slovenian. Along with the three dialects spoken in Venetian Slovenia and  the Slovene dialects of eastern Carinthia, Prekmurje Slovene is considered the most conservative of all Slovene dialects with regard to vocabulary. Many words in modern Prekmurje Slovene are borrowed from Hungarian and German. Examples of words that differ from standard Slovene include iža 'house' and lűšnost 'happiness' (cf. standard Sln. hiša, veselje). Other words are only superficially different because of phonological changes; for example, mesou 'meat' and závec 'rabbit' (cf. standard Sln. meso, zajec). There are dozens of Hungarian and German loanwords (e.g., roság 'country' < Hung. ország and čizma 'boot' < Hung. csizma). The frequent presence of German loanwords is particularly observable among the Hungarian Slovenes and in northern and western Prekmurje. Some words have different meanings in the dialect and in standard Slovene; for example, graj 'bean' (cf. standard Sln. grah 'pea') and stoul 'table'  (cf. standard Sln. stol 'chair').

Prekmurje Slovene subdialects 
 The Rába or Vendvidék subdialect ( Prekmurje Slovene: Bákerski/Porábski/Rábski govor), near the Rába River, in the Szentgotthárd district
 The Goričko subdialect ( Prekmurje Slovene: Gorički govor) in upper Prekmurje, Grad, north of Cankova)
 The Ravensko subdialect ( Prekmurje Slovene: Ravénski govor west of Cankova and south of Murska Sobota and Rakičan
 The Murska Sobota subdialect ( Prekmurje Slovene: Soboški govor) near Murska Sobota
 The Markovsko or Dolinsko subdialect ( Prekmurje Slovene: Dolénski i Markiški govor) south of Rakičan, near the Mura and Ledava rivers.

The Goričko dialect includes the Slaveči subdialect spoken by Miklós and István Küzmics.

History 
The Prekmurje dialect developed from the language of the Carantanian Slavs who settled around Balaton in the 9th century. Due to the political and geographical separation from other Slovene dialects (unlike most of contemporary Slovenia, which was part of the Holy Roman Empire, Prekmurje was under the authority of the Kingdom of Hungary for almost a thousand years), the Prekmurje dialect acquired many specific features. Separated from the cultural development of the remainder of ethnic Slovene territory, the Slovenes in Hungary gradually forged their own specific culture and also their own literary language.

In the end of the 16th century some Slovene Protestant pastor supported breaking away from Hungary. The pastors brought along the Bible of Primož Trubar and used it in Gornji Petrovci.

The first book in the Prekmurje dialect appeared in 1715, and was written by the Lutheran pastor Ferenc Temlin. In the 18th and early 19th century, a regional literature written in Prekmurje Slovene flourished. It comprised mostly (although not exclusively) of religious texts, written by both Protestant and Catholic clergymen. The most important authors were the Lutheran pastor István Küzmics and the Roman Catholic priest Miklós Küzmics who settled the standard for the Prekmurje regional standard language in the 18th century. Both of them were born in central Prekmurje, and accordingly the regional literary language was also based on the central sub-dialects of Prekmurje Slovene.

Miklós Küzmics in the 1790s rejected Standard Slovene. The poet, writer, translator, and journalist Imre Augustich made approaches toward standard Slovene, but retained the Hungarian alphabet. The poet Ferenc Sbüll also made motions toward accepting standard Slovene.

By the 16th century, a theory linking the Hungarian Slovenes to the ancient Vandals had become popular. Accordingly, Prekmurje Slovene was frequently designated in Hungarian Latin documents as the Vandalian language (Latin: lingua vandalica, Hungarian: Vandál nyelv, Prekmurje Slovene: vandalszki jezik or vandalszka vüszta).

With the advent of modernization in the mid-19th century, this kind of literature slowly declined. Nevertheless, the regional standard continued to be used in religious services. In the last decades of the 19th and 20th century, the denomination "Wends" and "Wendish language" was promoted, mostly by pro-Hungarians, in order to emphasize the difference between the Hungarian Slovenes and other Slovenes, including attempts to create a separate ethnic identity.

In 1919, most of Prekmurje was assigned to the Kingdom of Serbs, Croats and Slovenes, and Slovene replaced Hungarian as the language of education and administration. Standard Slovene gradually started to replace Prekmurje Slovene in the local Roman Catholic church, while the Lutheran community continued to use the dialect in their religious services. The local press tried to combine the old Prekmurje regional standard with standard Slovene, making it completely intelligible to Slovenes from other regions. In the late 1920s and 1930s, many Slovenes from the Julian March who fled from Fascist Italy settled in Prekmurje, especially in the town of Lendava. The Yugoslav authorities encouraged the settlements of Slovene political immigrants from the Kingdom of Italy in Prekmurje as an attempt to reduce the influence of the Magyar element in the region; besides, the western Slovene dialects were very difficult to understand for the people of Prekmurje, thus the use of standard Slovene became almost indispensable for the mutual understanding.

After World War II, the Lutheran Church also switched to standard Slovene in most of its parishes, and Prekmurje Slovene has since been relegated to almost exclusively private use. Nevertheless, along with Resian, the Prekmurje dialect is one of the few Slovene dialects still used by most speakers, with very little influence from standard Slovene. This creates a situation of diglossia, where the dialect is used as the predominant means of communication in private life, while the standard language is used in schools, administration, and the media. The situation is different among the Hungarian Slovenes, where standard Slovene is still very rarely used.

1823–1848 

A second wave of standardisation began in 1823. Mihály Barla issued a new hymnbook (Krscsanszke nove peszmene knige). József Kossics, a great writer and poet from Ptrekmurje, made contact with the Slovenian linguist  and thus get acquainted with the Styrian Slovenian dialect. Kossics first worked in Alsószölnök. The teacher of the village was József Vogrin (Jožef Vogrin) born into the Slovene Styria, and accordingly spoke the Styrian dialect. Kossics's father was of Croatian descent, and accordingly was also raised in the Kajkavian Croatian language. The Krátki návuk vogrszkoga jezika za zacsetníke, a Slovenian-Hungarian grammar book and dictionary let out the standard Prekmurje Slovene. The Zobriszani Szloven i Szlovenszka med Mürov in Rábov ethic-book, formed the ethics- and linguistic-norms. Zgodbe vogerszkoga králesztva and Sztarine Zseleznih ino Szalaszkih Szlovencov are the first Prekmurje Slovene Slovenian history books. Kossics was the first writer to write nonreligious poetry.

In 1820, a teacher named István Lülik wrote a new coursebook (Novi abeczedár), into which was made three issue (1853, 1856, 1863).
Sándor Terplán and János Kardos wrote a psalm book (Knige 'zoltárszke), and a hymnbook (Krsztsanszke czerkvene peszmi), the latter a reprint of Barla's hymn-book.

1870–1886 

János Kardos translated numerous verses from Sándor Petőfi, János Arany and few Hungarian poet. In 1870, he worked on a new coursebook, the Nôve knige cstenyá za vesznícski sôl drügi zlôcs.
In 1875, Imre Augustich established the first Prekmurje Slovene newspaper Prijátel (The Friend). Later, he wrote a new Hungarian–Prekmurje Slovene grammar (Návuk vogrszkoga jezika, 1876) and translated works from Hungarian poets and writers.

In 1886, József Bagáry wrote second course-book, which apply the Gaj alphabet (Perve knige – čtenyá za katholičánske vesničke šolê).

1914–1945 

In 1914-1918, the ethnic governor and later parliamentarian congressman in Belgrade József Klekl standardized Prekmurje Slovene, making use of the Croatian and Slovene languages. In 1923, the new prayerbook's Hodi k oltarskomi svesti (Come on to the Eucharist) orthography was written in the Gaj. Items in the newspapers the catholic Novine, Marijin list, Marijin ograček, calendar Kalendar Srca Jezušovoga, the Lutheran Düševni list and Evangeličanski kalendar were written in the Prekmurje Slovene.
József Szakovics took an active part in cultivating the Prekmurje dialect, although not all schools offered education in Prekmurje Slovene. The prominent Prekmurje writer Miško Kranjec also wrote in Slovene.

János Fliszár wrote a Hungarian-Wendish dictionary in 1922.  In 1941, the Hungarian Army seized back the Prekmurje area and by 1945 aimed to make an end of the Prekmurje dialect and Slovene by the help of Mikola.

After 1945, Communist Yugoslavia banned the printing of religious books in the Prekmurje dialects, and only standard Slovene was used in administration and education. In Hungary, the dictator Mátyás Rákosi banned every minority language and deported the Slovenes in the Hungarian Plain.

The question of the Wend or Prekmurje language 

The issue of how Prekmurje Slovene came to be a separate tongue has many theories. First, in the 16th century, there was a theory that the Slovenes east of the Mura were descendants of the Vandals, an East Germanic tribe of pre-Roman Empire era antiquity. The Vandal name was used not only as the "scientific" or ethnological term for Slovenes, but also to acknowledge that the Vandalic people were named the Szlovenci, szlovenszki, szlovenye (Slovenians).

In 1627, was issue the Protestant visitation in the country Tótság, or Slovene Circumscription (this is the historical name of the Prekmurje and Vendvidék, Prekmurje Slovene: Slovenska okroglina). Herein act a Slavic Bible in Gornji Petrovci, which as a matter of fact the Bible of Primož Trubar. From Carniola and Styria in the 16th and 17th centuries, a few Slovene Protestant pastors fled to Hungary and brought with them Trubar's Bible, which helped set the standard for Slovene. Not known by accident there was work on Prekmurje Slovene.

According to the Hungarian dissenters, the Wendish (Prekmurje Slovene) language was of Danish, Sorbian, Germanic, Celtic, Eastern Romance or West Slavic extraction. But this was often false, political or exaggerated affirmations.

According to extremist Hungarian groups, the Wends were captured by Turkish and Croatian troops who were later integrated into Hungarian society. Another popular theory created by some Hungarian nationalists was that the speakers of the Wendish language were "in truth" Magyar peoples, and some had merged into the Slavic population of Slovenia over the last 800 years.

In 1920, Hungarian physicist  wrote a number of books about Slovene inhabitants of Hungary and the Wendish language: the Wendish-Celtic theory. Accordingly, the Wends (Slovenians in Hungary) were of Celtic extraction, not Slavic. Later Mikola also adopted the belief that the Wends indeed were Slavic-speaking Hungarians. In Hungary, the state's ethnonationalistic program tried to prove his theories. Mikola also thought the Wends, Slovenes, and Croatians alike were all descendants of the Pannonian Romans, therefore they have Latin blood and culture in them as well.

During the Hungarian revolution when Hungarians rebelled against Habsburg rule, the Catholic Slovenes sided with the Catholic Habsburgs. The Lutheran Slovenians, however, supported the rebel Lajos Kossuth siding with Hungary and they pleaded for the separation of Hungary from Habsburg Austria which had its anti-Protestant policy. At that time, the reasoning that the inhabitants of the Rába Region were not Slovenes but Wends and "Wendish-Slovenes" respectively and that, as a consequence, their ancestral Slavic-Wendish language was not to be equated with the other Slovenes living in the Austro-Hungarian Empire was established. In the opinion of the Lutheran-Slovene priest of Hodoš, the only possibility for the Lutheran Slovenes emerging from the Catholic-Slovenian population group to continue was to support Kossuth and his Hungarian culture. Thereafter, the Lutheran Slovenes used their language in churches and schools in the most traditional way in order to distinguish themselves from the Catholic Slovenes and the Slovene language (i.e., pro-Hungarian or pan-Slavic Slovene literature). The Lutheran priests and believers remained of the conviction that they could only adhere to their Lutheran faith when following the wish of the Hungarians (or the Austrians) and considering themselves "Wendish-Slovenes". If they did not conform to this, then they were in danger of being assimilated into Hungarian culture.

In the years preceding World War I, the Hungarian Slovenes were swept into the ideology of Panslavism, the national unity of all Slavic-speaking peoples of Eastern Europe. The issue was volatile in the fragmented Austro-Hungarian empire, which was defeated in the war. In the 1921 Treaty of Trianon, the southern half (not the whole) of the Prekmurje region was ceded to the Kingdom of Serbs, Croats and Slovenes.

The Hungarian government in Budapest after 1867 tried to assimilate the Prekmurje Slovenes. In Somogy in the 19th century, there was still a ban on using Prekmurje Slovene. József Borovnyák, Ferenc Ivanóczy, and other Slovenian politicians and writers helped safeguard the Prekmurje dialect and identity.

In the late 20th century and today, the new notion for Hungarian Slovenians is to conceive Prekmurje Slovene is in fact the Slovene language, but not dialect. Their allusions: the Küzmics Gospels, the Old Grammar- and state-run public schools, the typical Prekmurje Slovene and Rába Slovene culture, the few centuries old-long isolation in Prekmurje Slovene and continued self-preservation from the Hungarian majority. The Hungarian Slovenes are more interested in being Slovenes.

In Communist Yugoslavia, Prekmurje Slovene was looked down upon because numerous writers, such as József Klekl, were anti-communists.

However, pseudoscientic and extremist theories continue to be propagated. Ethnological research has again looked into the "Celtic-Wends, Wendish-Magyars", "Pannonian Roman" and West Slavic theories. Tibor Zsiga, a prominent Hungarian historian in 2001 declared "The Slovene people cannot be declared Wends, neither in Slovenia, neither in Prekmurje." One may mind the Slovene/Slovenski name issue was under Pan-Slavism in the 19th-20th century, the other believes the issue was purely political in nature.

Examples 
A comparison of the Lord's Prayer in standard Slovene, Standard Prekmurje Slovene, Kajkavian Croatian, and standard Croatian. The Prekmurje Slovene version is taken from a 1942 prayer book (Zálozso János Zvér, Molitvena Kniga, Odobrena od cérkvene oblászti, Murska Sobota, 1942, third edition). The original Hungarian orthography has been transliterated into Gaj's Latin alphabet, as used in the other versions, for easier comparison.

Trivia
In 2018 a Prekmurje Slovene translation of Antoine de Saint-Exupéry's The Little Prince was published.

Singer and songwriter Nika Zorjan in 2018 created the Prekmurje Slovene version of Mariah Carey's All I Want for Christmas Is You aka Fse ka bi za Božič.

Gallery

See also 
 Languages of Slovenia
 List of Slovene writers and poets in Hungary
 Slovene March (Kingdom of Hungary)
 Vandalic language
 János Fliszár
 József Klekl (politician)
 Ágoston Pável

References

Sources 
 Mária Mukics: Changing World - The Hungarian Slovenians (Változó Világ - A magyarországi szlovének) Press Publica
 Mukics Ferenc: Szlovén Nyelvkönyv/Slovenska slovnica (Slovenian language-book), 1997. 
  Slovar stare knjižne prekmurščine, Založba ZRC, Ljubljana 2006. 
 Fliszár János: Magyar-vend szótár/Vogrszki-vendiski rêcsnik, Budapest 1922.
 Francek Mukič: Porabsko-knjižnoslovensko-madžarski slovar, Szombathely 2005. 
  
 
 Marc L. Greenberg: Glasoslovni opis treh prekmurskih govorov in komentar k zgodovinskemu glasoslovju in oblikoglasju prekmurskega narečja. Slavistična revija 41/4 (1993), 465-487.
 Marc L. Greenberg: Archaisms and innovations in the dialect of Središče: (Southeastern Prlekija, Slovenia). Indiana Slavic studies 7 (1994), 90-102.
 Marc L. Greenberg: Prekmurje grammar as a source of Slavic comparative material. Slovenski jezik 7 (2009), 28-44.
 Marc L. Greenberg: Slovar beltinskega prekmurskega govora. Slavistična revija 36 (1988). 452–456. [Review essay of Franc Novak, Slovar beltinskega prekmurskega govora [A Dictionary of the Prekmurje Dialect of Beltinci].
 Franci Just: Med verzuško in pesmijo, Poezija Prekmurja v prvi polovici 20. stoletja, Franc-Franc, Murska Sobota 2000. 
 Vilko Novak: Slovar stare knjižne prekmurščine, Založba ZRC, Ljubljana, 2006. 
 Vilko Novak: Martjanska pesmarica, Založba ZRC, Ljubljana, 1997. 
 Vilko Novak: Zgodovina iz spomina/Történelem emlékezetből – Polemika o knjigi Tiborja Zsige Muravidéktől Trianonig/Polémia Zsiga Tibor Muravidéktől Trianonig című könyvéről, Založba ZRC, Ljubljana, 2004. 
 Anton Trstenjak: Slovenci na Ogrskem, Narodopisna in književna črtica, objava arhivskih virov MARIBOR 2006. 
 Marija Kozar: Etnološki slovar slovencev na Madžarskem, Monošter-Szombathely 1996. 
 Források a Muravidék történetéhez 1./Viri za zgodovino Prekmurja 1. Szombathely-Zalaegerszeg, 2008.  Ö
 Források a Muravidék történetéhez/Viri za zgodovino Prekmurja 2. Szombathely-Zalaegerszeg 2008. 
 Molitvena Kniga, Odobrena od cérkvene oblászti, edit: József Szakovics 1942.
 Pokrajinski muzej Murska Sobota, Katalog stalne razstave, Murska Sobota 1997. 
 Jerneja Kopitarja Glagolita Clozianus/Cločev Glagolit, Ljubljana 1995. 
 Življenje in delo Jožefa Borovnjaka, Edit: , Maribor 2008.
 Bea Baboš Logar: Prekmurska narečna slovstvena ustvarjalnost – mednarodno znanstveno srečanje: prekmurščina zanimiva tudi za tuje znanstvenike, Vestnik July 17, 2003.
 Predgovor. Nouvi Zákon, Stevan Küzmics, Pokrajinski Muzej Murska Sobota 2008.  (Translations: in English Peter Lamovec; in Hungarian Gabriella Bence; in Slovene Mihael Kuzmič)

External links 
 Marko Jesenšek: STILISTIKA PREKMURSKIH OGLAŠEVALSKIH BESEDIL/STYLISTICS IN ADVERTISING TEXTS IN PREKMURJE
 László Göncz: The Hungarians in Prekmurje 1918-1941 (A muravidéki magyarság 1918-1941)
 Hungarian books in Prekmurje Slovenian 1715-1919
 Hungarian books in Prekmurje Slovenian 1920-1944
 PREKMURSKI PUBLICISTIČNI JEZIK V PRVI POLOVICI 20. STOLETJA
 Američan, ki je doktoriral iz prekmurščine
 "Zame prekmurščina ni narečje, temveč jezik" – Branko Pintarič, gledališki ustvarjalec (For Me, Prekmurje Slovenian Is Not a Dialect, But a Language)
 Preučevanje jezika in literature (Slovene)
 Marko Jesenšek: The Slovene Language in the Alpine and Pannonian Language Area
 Six stories from Prekmurje (1)

 
Cultural heritage of Slovenia